ACP-105 is a drug which acts as a selective androgen receptor modulator (SARM). It has been investigated for the treatment of age-related cognitive decline.

See also 
 AC-262,536
 Enobosarm
 GLPG-0492
 JNJ-28330835
 Ligandrol

References 

Selective androgen receptor modulators
Chloroarenes
Nitrogen heterocycles
Heterocyclic compounds with 2 rings
Nitriles
Tertiary alcohols